Surgeon Vice-Admiral Philip Iain Raffaelli, CB, QHP, FRCP (born 24 November 1955 in Kirkcaldy, Fife) is a British general practitioner and Royal Naval Medical Officer.  Raffaelli served as Surgeon General of the British Armed Forces until 2012.

Military career
Raffaelli joined the Royal Navy as a cadet in 1976, while studying medicine at Edinburgh Medical School.  Raffaelli joined the Royal Navy Submarine Service and worked as a medical officer from 1979, working for a time on submarines.  In 2007, he became the head of the Royal Navy Medical Service, the Medical Director General (Naval), as Surgeon Rear-Admiral, before assuming the position of Surgeon-General on 22 December 2009, taking over from Lieutenant-General Louis Lillywhite.

Honours
Raffaelli was appointed as an Honorary Physician to the Queen in 2005, and later as a Fellow of the Royal College of Physicians.  He is also a Governor of the University Hospitals Birmingham NHS Foundation Trust, and an appointee to the court of the London School of Hygiene & Tropical Medicine

References

Living people
Companions of the Order of the Bath
Royal Navy Medical Service officers
Fellows of the Royal College of Physicians
1955 births
Surgeons-General of the British Armed Forces
Royal Navy vice admirals
People from Kirkcaldy
Royal Navy submariners
Commanders of the Order of St John
Alumni of the University of Edinburgh